IFM Investors is a provider of investment services.

As at 30 June 2021, IFM Investors invests on behalf of more than 550 institutions worldwide, including pension, superannuation and sovereign wealth funds, universities, insurers, endowment funds and foundations.

History 
Established in 1990, the firm started off as the Development Australia Fund (DAF Limited). It was established to invest in growing Australian private and public companies and infrastructure assets. In 1994, Industry Funds Services (IFS) was established to provide advice and specialist investment expertise in infrastructure, private equity and Australian equities. Industry Funds Management (IFM) was created through the merger of IFS Capital Group and DAF Limited in 2004.
Industry Funds Management (IFM) changed its name to IFM Investors in 2013.

In 2018, the company Fomento de Construcciones y Contratas (FCC) decided to sell 49% of the capital of its subsidiary FCC Aqualia to the IFM Global Infrastructure Fund (through Global Infraco Spain) for 1,024 million euros.

Corporate responsibilities 
IFM Investors has been a signatory to the United Nations-supported Principles for Responsible Investment (UNPRI) since 2008 and has a Group Corporate Environmental, Social & Government Policy that determines its approach to the governance of investee entities. The firm is committed to reducing the carbon impact of its investments, targeting net zero greenhouse gas emissions across asset classes by 2050.

References

Investment companies of Australia
Companies based in Melbourne
Australian companies established in 1990
Financial services companies established in 1990